Dale Dwight Douglass (March 5, 1936 – July 6, 2022) was an American professional golfer who won tournaments at both the PGA Tour and the Champions Tour level.

Douglass was born in Wewoka, Oklahoma. He grew up in Fort Morgan, Colorado, where graduated from high school in 1956.  Douglass graduated from University of Colorado in 1959, turned pro in 1960, and joined the PGA Tour in 1963. He played on the 1969 Ryder Cup team.

Douglass won three times and earned $573,351 in just under 25 years on the PGA Tour. His best finish in a major championship was T-13 at the 1969 U.S. Open. His fortunes improved dramatically when he reached the age of 50 and joined the Senior PGA Tour (now known as the PGA Tour Champions). In this venue, Douglass had 11 wins including the 1986 U.S. Senior Open and accumulated approximately $7 million in earnings.

Douglass lived in Paradise Valley, Arizona. He died in Scottsdale, Arizona, on July 6, 2022 at the age of 86.

Professional wins (21)

PGA Tour wins (3)

PGA Tour playoff record (0–3)

Other wins (3)
1965 Arizona Open
1978 Jerry Ford Invitational (tie with Ed Sneed)
1983 Colorado PGA Championship

Senior PGA Tour wins (11)

*Note: The 1992 NYNEX Commemorative was shortened to 36 holes due to rain.

Senior PGA Tour playoff record (4–4)

Other senior wins (4)
1990 Liberty Mutual Legends of Golf (with Charles Coody)
1994 Liberty Mutual Legends of Golf (with Charles Coody)
1998 Liberty Mutual Legends of Golf (Legends Division with Charles Coody)
1998 Liberty Mutual Legends of Golf (Legendary Division with Charles Coody)

Results in major championships

CUT = missed the half-way cut
"T" = tied

Senior major championships

Wins (1)

Legacy 

 Dale Douglass Classic, annual golf tournament held at the Fort Morgan golf course.

 Dale and Joyce Douglass Scholarship

See also
List of golfers with most PGA Tour Champions wins

References

External links

American male golfers
Colorado Buffaloes men's golfers
PGA Tour golfers
PGA Tour Champions golfers
Ryder Cup competitors for the United States
Winners of senior major golf championships
Golfers from Oklahoma
People from Wewoka, Oklahoma
People from Castle Rock, Colorado
1936 births
2022 deaths